Sclerosteosis is an autosomal recessive disorder characterized by bone overgrowth. It was first described in 1958 but given the current name in 1967. Excessive bone formation is most prominent in the skull, mandible and tubular bones. It can cause facial distortion and syndactyly. Increased intracranial pressure can cause sudden death in patients. It is a rare disorder that is most prominent in the Afrikaner population in South Africa (40 patients), but there have also been cases of American and Brazilian families.

Cause
Sclerosteosis is caused by mutations in the gene that encode for the sclerostin protein. The sclerostin protein is necessary in inhibiting canonical wnt signalling. Wnt signalling results in increased osteoblast activity and RANKL synthesis, sclerostine therefore increases boneformation by indirectly inhibiting RANKL synthesis and thus osteoclast activitation.

References

External links
 These Superhumans Are Real and Their DNA Could Be Worth Billions
 Sclerostin Inhibition in the Management of Osteoporosis
 Effect of bone thickening on the skull area: need of skull removal

Genetic diseases and disorders